The 1874 Mayo by-election was fought on 29 May 1874.  The by-election was fought due to the void elections of the incumbent Home Rule MPs, George Ekins Browne and Thomas Tighe. George Eakins Browne was re-elected while Thomas Tighe was defeated by John O'Connor Power.

Previous election

By-election

References 

By-elections to the Parliament of the United Kingdom in County Mayo constituencies
1874 elections in the United Kingdom
1874 elections in Ireland